The Montezuma Hotel is a historic building in Nogales, Arizona. It was built in 1926, and designed in the Spanish Colonial Revival architectural style. It was built as the largest hotel in Nogales. It has been listed on the National Register of Historic Places since August 26, 1985.

References

National Register of Historic Places in Santa Cruz County, Arizona
Colonial architecture in the United States
Hotel buildings completed in 1926
1926 establishments in Arizona